Hitachi is a multinational corporation specializing in high-technology.

Hitachi  may also refer to:

Places
Hitachi, Ibaraki, Japan
Hitachi Province, former province of Japan

People
Hanako, Princess Hitachi (born 1940), member of the Japanese imperial family
Masahito, Prince Hitachi (born 1935), member of the Japanese imperial family

Companies

Hitachi Works, the oldest member of the Hitachi group and ancestral home of Hitachi, Ltd.
Hitachi Cable, independent spin-off of Hitachi Works
Hitachi Canadian Industries Ltd. (HCI), an independent subsidiary of Hitachi, Ltd. located in Saskatoon, Canada
Hitachi Construction Machinery (Europe), subsidiary of Hitachi, Ltd., now parent of Euclid Trucks
Hitachi Data Systems, a subsidiary of Hitachi, with enterprise storage systems group based both in Japan and in Santa Clara, California, US
Hitachi Global Storage Technologies, disk drive manufacturer, wholly owned subsidiary of Western Digital
Hitachi Maxell Ltd., commonly known as Maxell, a separate Japanese electronics company
Hitachi Zosen Corporation — Osaka based engineering and heavy equipment company (also known as Hitachi Shipbuilding)

Products
Hitachi Hatsukaze, aircraft engines built in Japan
Hitachi Magic Wand, a massager and vibrator

Trains
Hitachi (Australian train), EMUs formerly in use in Melbourne, Australia, manufactured by Hitachi, Ltd. in the 1970s
Hitachi (Japanese train), a limited express train service in Japan named after the old province of Hitachi
Hitachi A-train, a series of trains manufactured by Hitachi, Ltd.

Other uses
Hitachi Foundation, a philanthropic organization founded in the U.S. by Hitachi in 1985
Hitachi Tree, a named monkeypod tree in Moanalua Gardens and the corporate symbol of Hitachi, Ltd.
T 258/03, also called Auction method/Hitachi, a decision of the Boards of Appeal of the European Patent Office

See also
Hibachi
Hitachino (disambiguation)